Wan Soon Bee is a Singaporean former politician. A member of the governing People's Action Party (PAP), he was the Member of Parliament (MP) for West Coast SMC, Pasir Panjang GRC, Brickworks GRC and West Coast GRC.

Early life and education
Born in 1939, Wan completed his pre-tertiary education at Raffles Institution and later graduated with a Dottore Ingegnere Degree in electronics engineering from the University of Pisa.

Political career
As he entered politics, Wan eventually became promoted to become political aecretary of the People's Action Party from October 1982 to September 1983 and later became the Minister of State in the Prime Minister's Office from September 1983 to 1985.

In the 1988 general election, Wan and his team contested in Pasir Panjang GRC gaining 61.57% of the cast votes in his first contested election and thereby defeating the only other fielded opposing party.

He has since retired from politics as of 2001.

Other office positions held
Wan served as xhairman of Ntuc Comfort, and later the Comfort Group (1986-1998); was the first advisor to Union of Telecoms Employees of Singapore (1985-1992); the manager at Olivetti (Singapore) Private Limited (Apr 1970-Feb 1981); and the independent director of the Lian Beng Group LTD.

References

Singaporean people of Hokkien descent
Members of the Cabinet of Singapore
Members of the Parliament of Singapore
1939 births
Living people
People's Action Party politicians